David Barrow may refer to:

 David Crenshaw Barrow Jr. (1852–1929), American educator, chancellor of the University of Georgia
 David D. Barrow (1876–1948), American sailor and Medal of Honor recipient
 David Francis Barrow (1888–1970), American mathematician
 Dave Barrow (1947–2022),Canadian politician,  mayor of Richmond Hill, Ontario, Canada